Libmanan Caves National Park is a protected area of the Philippines located in Barangay Sigamot in the municipality of Libmanan, Camarines Sur in Bicol Region. It is centered on the massive 2,856-meter-long Colapnitan Cave, the tenth longest cave in the Philippines. The park itself covers a total area of 19.4 hectares across the hilly farmlands of Libmanan, known to host at least 18 more limestone caves of varying lengths, shapes and wonder. It was established in 1934 by virtue of Proclamation No. 654.

The park is famous as the habitat of thousand of bats whose guano has been gathered from the cave for decades. It is also home to swiftlets and some great long-armed spiders of the species Phrynus, known to be poisonous.

References

See also
List of national parks of the Philippines

National parks of the Philippines
Protected areas established in 1934
1934 establishments in the Philippines
Geography of Camarines Sur
Landforms of Camarines Sur
Caves of the Philippines
Tourist attractions in Camarines Sur